Balitang Bicolandia is a Philippine television news broadcasting show broadcast by GMA Bicol. Originally anchored by Katherine Henry, Jessie Cruzat, and Rhayne Palino, it premiered on February 1, 2021. Kate Delovieres and Jessie Cruzat currently serve as the anchors.

Overview
The newscast covers the most significant news and features in the Bicol Region through the network's news teams from Naga City and news stringers across the region. It also marks the return of GMA Bicol as an originating station, almost six years after it was closed down due to mass layoffs and financial difficulties brought about by streamlining of GMA Regional TV's operations, thus resulting in the Southern Luzon stations broadcasting the entire national programming lineup from GMA Channel 7 Manila. Prior to the newscast's launch, GMA Regional TV already had its news team reporting and anchors for the national GMA Regional TV Weekend News (later Regional TV Weekend News now Regional TV News), as well as in other local news programs of the network.

Balitang Bicolandia airs from Monday to Friday from 5:10 PM to 5:40 PM on GMA Naga (TV-7) with a simulcast over TV-12 Legazpi, TV-8 Daet, TV-2 Sorsogon, TV-13 Catanduanes, and TV-7 Masbate.

Balitang Bicolandia was also re-aired for national viewers under GTV's late-night block "Regional TV Strip" on a weekly basis every Friday night at 11:50 PM, replacing the RTV Morning Programs (from February 1 to July 23, 2021). 

The program also airs worldwide on GMA News TV.

In late July, Katherine Henry left the newscast due to health reasons, leaving Palino and Cruzat as the remaining anchors. Cruzat became the solo anchor of the program several months after. On January 26, 2022, Former TV Patrol Bicol Reporter Kate Delovieres joined the anchor team, replacing both former co-anchors.

During Eleksyon 2022 Special Coverage, Balitang Bicolandia Early Edition has a soft launch from May 9-10.

Area of Coverage
Camarines Sur
Naga 
Albay
Legazpi
Camarines Norte
Daet
Catanduanes
Virac 
Masbate
Masbate City 
Sorsogon
Sorsogon City

Personalities

Current
 Jessie Cruzat 
 Kate Delovieres 
 Chariza Pagtalunan-Olivares   
 Mary Dawn Jimenez 
 Rose Nieva 
 Jessica Calinog 
 Cristopher Novelo

Former
 Katherine Henry  
 Rhayne Palino 
 Charm Ragiles 
 Veblen Reynes

Segments
 Alerto Bicolandia
 Kamugtakan Kan Panahon
 Pasyaran Ta
 Oragon
 #Spreadkindness
 Coronavirus Pandemic Watch
 Baretang Barangay
 Agri Bareta
 Viral na ni
 Aking Bicolandia
 Pet-Malu / Hayop sa Balita
 Exclusive
 Kapuso sa Kalikasan
 Namitan Ta
 Kapuso Barangayan on Wheels
 RTV Presents
 G na G
 Showbits
 Baretang Salud
 Market Watch
 Time Out
 Good News
 Sports Synergy

References

External links

2021 Philippine television series debuts
GMA Network news shows
GMA Integrated News and Public Affairs shows
Philippine television news shows
Mass media in Naga, Camarines Sur